The electoral history of Jesse Helms begins with his election to Raleigh City Council.  However, most of the elections in which he was involved were to the United States Senate.  Five consecutive victories gave Jesse Helms a thirty-year Senate career.

Raleigh City Council

United States Senate

1972 election

1978 election

Helms won the Republican Party's nomination unopposed.

1984 election

1990 election

1996 election

Helms won the Republican Party's nomination unopposed.

Vice President of the United States
Helms ran for the Republican Party's nomination for Vice President a number of times.  However, he always withdrew his nomination before the party national convention.  Nonetheless, two 'Draft Helms' movements have led to him winning a number of unsolicited delegates at the convention, placing him second (in a one-horse race) both times.

1976 Republican National Convention

1980 Republican National Convention

Footnotes

Jesse Helms
Helms, Jesse